Happy Face Killer is a 2014 Canadian-American television film inspired by real-life events of the hunt and capture of serial killer Keith Hunter Jesperson. The film premiered on March 1, 2014, on the Lifetime network and starred David Arquette as Jesperson. Gloria Reuben played Melinda Gand, the lead FBI case investigator.

Plot
Over the course of two years, Keith Jesperson (David Arquette), a long-haul truck driver, kills at least eight women, following his failed marriage and an injury which prevented him from joining the Royal Canadian Mounted Police. He meets his first victim in a Portland, Oregon bar and kills her after an argument in his rented home. When Delores Parnicke falsely confesses to committing the murder with her boyfriend, Jesperson sends disturbing letters to the press and even writes confessions on the wall of a highway rest stop and at the body dumps. He signs his notes with a smiley face, earning himself the nickname, "Happy Face Killer", as he resumes his killing spree.

Jesperson is being tracked by FBI Agent Melinda Gand (Gloria Reuben) and Ruskin County Sheriff (Daryl Shuttleworth), with little help from the district attorney after Parnicke confesses to the first murder. It is not until a young mother comes forward to say Jesperson assaulted her, and his new fiancée Diane Loftin (Stefanie von Pfetten) disappears, that he can finally be apprehended.

Cast

Main
 David Arquette as Keith Jesperson
 Gloria Reuben as FBI agent-in-charge Melinda Gand
 Daryl Shuttleworth as Sheriff J. D. Cotton, the Ruskin County, Washington, sheriff
 Stefanie von Pfetten as Diane Loftin, Keith's fiancée and last victim
 Josh Blacker as Peter Anselo, Gand's fellow FBI agent

Supporting
 Melissa Montgomery as Felicia Boones, Cotton's administrative assistant
 Emily Haine as Sissy Peyton, Keith's first victim
 Jordana Largy as Candy Smith, a young mother who was released by Keith
 Mittita Barber as Summer Northern, Keith's second victim
 Kelly-Ruth Mercier as Delores Parnicke
 David Pearson as Dez Whitman, Keith's dispatcher
 Vanessa Walsh as Taffy Billings, who teased Keith at a truck stop and later became his seventh victim
 Peter Flemming as John Jesperson, Keith's brother
 Spencer Drever as young Keith Jesperson
 Kurt Evans as District Attorney Levi Mayford
 Karyn Mott as Becky Sue Bailing, Keith's fourth victim
 Darren McGee as Bud Skinner, Delores's boyfriend
 Jodi Thompson as Cora Jesperson, Keith's ex-wife and mother of his children
 April Telek as Wanda, Dez's administrative assistant

Production
The film is produced by Happy Face Productions/Front Street Pictures, executive produced by Tom Patricia and produced by Harvey Kahn. The script was written by Richard Christian Matheson and directed by Rick Bota.

In October 2013, David Arquette was cast in the lead role of serial killer Keith Hunter Jesperson. Filming began in Vancouver, British Columbia, Canada, in November 2013. In a Lifetime interview, Arquette spoke about getting into character to portray Jesperson: "I got into character by researching of course but also by tapping into that dark side of mankind. It's all around us so it's easy to see and feel. I would try to understand why he did certain things the way he would. For instance, if someone is rude or belittles you, most people would get upset or yell back at them, Keith would lash out. There were times while filming when something like that would happen and I could picture what he would have done and that becomes very scary to know that people like that are out there and think in those terms".

Reception

Ratings
In its original airing on March 1, 2014, Happy Face Killer was watched by 2.02 million viewers and received a 0.46 rating in the 18-49 age demographic.

Critical reception
Jean Bentley of Zap2it's "From Inside the Box" called Happy Face Killer "truly disturbing". She added, "As far as Lifetime movies go, this one was pretty middle-of-the-road. No performances were outrageously campy — though all low-budget thrillers on this network seem to have some level of cheesiness to them. Gloria Reuben was certainly believable as a tough FBI investigator chasing after Jesperson, and the scenes of David Arquette strangling women were truly terrifying".

Notes

References

External links 
 
 

2014 television films
2014 films
2010s serial killer films
American serial killer films
Canadian serial killer films
Crime films based on actual events
English-language Canadian films
Films shot in Vancouver
Lifetime (TV network) films
Trucker films
Films with screenplays by Richard Christian Matheson
Films about the Federal Bureau of Investigation
2010s American films
2010s Canadian films